Group B of the 2015 FIFA Women's World Cup consisted of Germany, Ivory Coast, Norway and Thailand. Matches were played from 7 to 15 June 2015.

Teams

Standings

In the round of 16:
Germany advanced to play Sweden (third-placed team of Group D).
Norway advanced to play England (runner-up of Group F).

Matches

Norway vs Thailand

Germany vs Ivory Coast

Germany vs Norway

Ivory Coast vs Thailand

Thailand vs Germany

Ivory Coast vs Norway

References

External links
Official website

Group B
Group
2015 in Thai football
Group
2014–15 in Ivorian football